The Early Years (1996–2001) is the first compilation album by American Christian rock band Skillet. It includes songs from Skillet's first five studio albums, excluding Ardent Worship. Two music videos, "Best Kept Secret" and "Gasoline" are also included in the compilation.

Track listing

Videos

Personnel
 John Cooper – lead vocals, bass
 Ken Steorts – lead guitar (tracks 2–5, 7, 11)
 Kevin Haaland – lead guitar (tracks 1, 6, 10, 12)
 Ben Kasica – lead guitar (tracks 8, 9, 13)
 Korey Cooper – rhythm guitar, keyboards, backing vocals (tracks 1, 6, 8–10, 12, 13)
 Trey McClurklin – drums (tracks 2–5, 7, 11)
 Lori Peters – drums (tracks 8, 9, 13)

References 

Skillet (band) albums
2010 albums